Ugain Point, Rugged Island  
 Ugarchin Point, Robert Island  
 Ugorelets Point, Low Island
 Urania Cove, Two Hummock Island
 Urda Ridge, Clarence Island
 Urdoviza Glacier, Livingston Island  
 Urguri Nunatak, Trinity Peninsula  
 Urovene Cove, Graham Coast
 Urvich Wall, Livingston Island  
 Ushi Cliffs, Oscar II Coast
 Ushlinova Peak, Graham Coast
 Ustina Point, Tower Island  
 Ustra Peak, Livingston Island  
 Utus Peak, Trinity Peninsula

See also 
 Bulgarian toponyms in Antarctica

External links 
 Bulgarian Antarctic Gazetteer
 SCAR Composite Gazetteer of Antarctica
 Antarctic Digital Database (ADD). Scale 1:250000 topographic map of Antarctica with place-name search.
 L. Ivanov. Bulgarian toponymic presence in Antarctica. Polar Week at the National Museum of Natural History in Sofia, 2–6 December 2019

Bibliography 
 J. Stewart. Antarctica: An Encyclopedia. Jefferson, N.C. and London: McFarland, 2011. 1771 pp.  
 L. Ivanov. Bulgarian Names in Antarctica. Sofia: Manfred Wörner Foundation, 2021. Second edition. 539 pp.  (in Bulgarian)
 G. Bakardzhieva. Bulgarian toponyms in Antarctica. Paisiy Hilendarski University of Plovdiv: Research Papers. Vol. 56, Book 1, Part A, 2018 – Languages and Literature, pp. 104-119 (in Bulgarian)
 L. Ivanov and N. Ivanova. Bulgarian names. In: The World of Antarctica. Generis Publishing, 2022. pp. 114-115. 

Antarctica
 
Bulgarian toponyms in Antarctica
Names of places in Antarctica